Trio World Academy was established in 2007 in Sahakara Nagar, Bangalore, India. It is a private international school offering the IB Primary Year Program (IB PYP), Cambridge International Examinations (IGCSE) and IB diploma programme IBDP) programme.. The school has served over 55 different nationalities and currently represent students from over 28 countries.  The core values of the school are Leadership , Excellent Academics, Discipline and Service.

The school has been recognised as an "Institute of Happiness" by QS I-GAUGE. The school promotes happiness and positive teacher-student relationships as a top priority.

IB PYP (Primary Year Programme) 
The school offers PYP from Nursery through grade 5. PYP programme encourages students to enquire, understanding complex and interdependent world, prepare them as a confident communicator, seeing things from different perspective, making them caring & responsible citizen, International Mindedness and learning how to learn.

IGCSE (International General Certificate of Secondary Education) 
Trio is  also affiliated with Cambridge University , UK and follows Secondary 1 and IGCSE programme from grade 6 till 10th. Cambridge IGCSE helps improve performance by developing skills in creative thinking, enquiry and problem solving. It is the perfect springboard to IB Diploma.

IB Diploma 
Trio World Academy offers an IB Diploma program for grades 11 and 12. It is recognised and valued by the Indian National Universities. Some international universities also give extra credit points for DP graduates. IB encourages critical thinking, confidence building & Independent learning, time management skills & Internationally mindedness.

In the year 2021, Sanjana Choudary Gunapaneni has scored a perfect score (45) in the IB DP Examination.

Associations & Recognition 

 Trio is a PSAT and SAT center
 Global School Alliance
 Alliance française de Bangalore
 FCB Barca Academy 
 Limca Book of Records for collecting highest e-waste in a week
 The students, with the help of Fair Trade India, made India's largest T-shirt and the world's largest sustainable T-shirt made out of fair trade and organic cotton. It was unveiled at the campus. Approximately 380 kg of cotton seed was used to create a total of 5,140 km length of cotton yarn, which weighed about 94kg 
 Japanese Supplementary School of Bangaluru  Hoshū jugyō kō (補習授業校), or hoshūkō (補習校) runs in the campus

Notable alumni 
 Anjali Anish was a Times Fresh Face in 2020 and is a Sandalwood actress tor known for the movie Padavi Poorva 
 Nisha Lobo has appeared on the Satyamev Jayate TV show and became Vicks' "Touch of Care" initiative brand ambassador.
 Karun Balachandran, wrote a book name "The Teenager's Guide to the Universe,"

Scholarships 
Every year, the school awards over $25,000 in academic and athletic scholarships to IB Diploma students

Gifted Students 

 Aarav Nallur, in 2019 at the age of 9, while still in Grade 4, took the IGCSE Mathematics examination and got an A+ (88% in Advanced Mathematics).
 Virat Karan our primary student attempted a World record in painting
 Nikaya of IGCSE got the highest marks in sociology in India, 2015-16 session

Trio World School ICSE 
The ICSE wing of the school is known as Trio World School (TWS). The school follows a blended experiential curriculum until class 7. The school was founded on the principles of experiential learning and values. The school gives equal importance to academics and co-curricular activities.

The cellist,Cellist Audun André perperik has, performed in the school in 2017.

Karnataka Topper 
In the year 2022, Adi Kishore has topped the ICSE 10th Exam in Karnataka and ranked 2nd in India with 99.60%.

Government School Support 
TWS students assist and teach English and mathematics at Kodigehalli Primary Government School. Every year, TRIO students raise funds to gift them uniforms, shoes, mats, and stationery. The toilet and school building were constructed with the help of the student council and management efforts.

References 

International schools in Bangalore
Cambridge schools in India
Boarding schools in Karnataka
Educational institutions established in 2007
International Baccalaureate schools in India
High schools and secondary schools in Bangalore
Schools in India
Schools in Bangalore
2007 establishments in Karnataka